Amorupi fulvoterminata is a species of longhorn beetle in the Elaphidiini subfamily. It was described by Carlos Berg in 1889.

References

Elaphidiini
Beetles described in 1889